Hernán Gumy was the defending champion, but lost in the second round this year.

Julián Alonso won the title, defeating Marcelo Ríos 6–2, 6–1 in the final.

Seeds

  Marcelo Ríos (final)
  Francisco Clavet (second round)
  Tommy Haas (first round)
  Julián Alonso (champion)
  Marcelo Filippini (semifinals)
  Galo Blanco (first round)
  Karim Alami (first round)
  Carlos Costa (first round)

Draw

Finals

Top half

Bottom half

External links
 Singles draw

Singles